Eastern Gateway Community College is a public community college with its main campus in Steubenville, Ohio, and a second campus in Youngstown. Although the college is accredited by the Higher Learning Commission, its accreditor placed the college on probation in 2021 for concerns about "assessment, HR record keeping and data collection and analysis."

History
The school was founded in 1966 as Jefferson County Technical Institute, opening its doors for the first time in 1968 to serve the residents of Jefferson County, Ohio. It later changed its name to Jefferson Technical College in 1977. In 1995, the technical college became a community college and the name changed once more to Jefferson Community College. In 2009, the college expanded its service district to include three Ohio counties in addition to the original Jefferson: Columbiana, Mahoning, and Trumbull. This resulted in a further name change and the college became known as Eastern Gateway Community College in October 2009.

The college briefly drew national attention in 2020 when its board of trustees fired the college's president. He had been placed on administrative leave and was subsequently fired by a unanimous vote of the board for "dereliction of duty and inappropriate management."

In late 2021, the college was again the focus of national attention when its accreditor, the Higher Learning Commission, placed the college on probation due to concerns about a new relationship with a for-profit company that focused on increasing student enrollments in online courses. Through its relationship with the Student Resource Center, EGCC nearly doubled its class sizes in online courses and eliminated textbooks in those courses. These new enrollments came primarily from union members or their family members as the program was largely aimed at allowing them to attend the college for free. In a November 2021 news article, Inside Higher Ed reported that "43,890 of the 46,606 [students enrolled at the college] are union members or family of union members." The Student Resource Center received 50% of the profits from these new enrollments which was "slightly more than $7 million" in the 2020 fiscal year. Concerns about the quality of teaching at the college during this rapid expansion prompted the college's accreditor to place it on probation because "there is no evidence Eastern Gateway’s free-college-for-union-members business model provides a high-quality education." Two months later, these same concerns led the U.S. Department of Education to open its own investigation into the use of federal financial aid at the college.

The Jefferson Community College and Eastern Gateway Community College logos were designed by Paul/Jay Associates of Bellaire, Ohio.

Admissions
The college uses open admissions.

Academic programs
Eastern Gateway Community College offers 60 majors in the areas of business technologies, information technologies, engineering technologies, health and public services. The degrees offered are Associate of Arts, Associate of Science, Associate of Applied Business, Associate of Applied Science, Associate of Technical Studies, and Associate of Individualized Studies.

Tuition and fees
Tuition for in-state students enrolled during the 2017–2018 academic year was $117 per credit hour. Tuition is waived for students living in Jefferson, Mahoning, Trumbull, and Columbiana counties.

References

External links
Eastern Gateway Community College

Educational institutions established in 1966
Community colleges in Ohio
Education in Jefferson County, Ohio
Education in Mahoning County, Ohio
Education in Columbiana County, Ohio
Education in Trumbull County, Ohio
1966 establishments in Ohio